Alexander M. Spokoyny is an American chemist and associate professor in chemistry and biochemistry at UCLA and a faculty member of the California NanoSystems Institute (CNSI).

Education 
Spokoyny has started his research career as an undergraduate student at UCLA working in the laboratory of M. Frederick Hawthorne. He received his Ph.D. degree in 2011 from Northwestern University in inorganic and materials chemistry working with Chad Mirkin. Spokoyny then conducted a post-doctoral research stint at MIT in chemical biology until 2014 working jointly with Stephen L. Buchwald and Bradley L. Pentelute on peptide stapling and organometallic bioconjugation chemistry.

Career 
Spokoyny group's research encompasses an interdisciplinary approach focusing on pressing problems in chemistry, biology and materials science with emphasis on developing new molecular cluster chemistry. Spokoyny has also been involved in teaching at California prison facilities as a part of UCLA Prison Education program.

Awards 
Spokoyny is a recipient of multiple national and international awards including Camille Dreyfus Teacher-Scholar Award (2020), Thieme Chemistry Journal Award (2020), NSF CAREER Award (2019), Cottrell Scholar from Research Corporation for Science Advancement (2018), Maximizing Investigator’s Research Award (MIRA) from the NIH (2017), Alfred P. Sloan Research Fellowship (2017), Chemical and Engineering News (C&EN) Talented 12 (2016), 3M Non-Tenured Faculty Award (2016), International Union of Pure and Applied Chemistry (IUPAC) Prize for Young Chemists (2012) and American Chemical Society Inorganic Young Investigator Award (2011).

References 

21st-century American chemists
University of California, Los Angeles faculty
Year of birth missing (living people)
Living people
Northwestern University alumni
University of California, Los Angeles alumni